Pedro Reginaldo Lira, (September 7, 1915 – December 11, 2012) was an Argentine Bishop of the Roman Catholic Church.

Biography
Lira was born in Salta, Argentina in 1915 and was ordained a bishop on September 21, 1938. He was appointed Auxiliary Bishop of the Archdiocese of Salta and Titular Bishop of Tenedus on July 16, 1958, and ordained bishop on September 7, 1958 (his 43rd Birthday). Lira was then appointed bishop of the Diocese of San Francisco in Argentina on June 12, 1961. He resigned from this post on June 22, 1965, and was then appointed Titular bishop of Castellum in Mauretania. He was again appointed to Auxiliary Bishop of the Archdiocese of Salta in 1967 and resigned from that position on May 12, 1978, along with the Titular Bishop of Castellum in Mauretania.

See also

References

External links
Catholic Hierarchy
Salta Diocese Site (Spanish)

1915 births
2012 deaths
20th-century Roman Catholic bishops in Argentina
Participants in the Second Vatican Council
Roman Catholic bishops of San Francisco
Roman Catholic bishops of Salta